Naziha Syed Ali is a Pakistani investigative journalist. An Assistant Editor at Dawn, she has carried out investigation into real estate corruption, police involvement in encounter killings and enforced conversion to Islam. In 2020 she was the subject of a half-hour profile by Owen Bennett-Jones on the BBC World Service.

In 2016 Naziha Syed Ali reported on collusion between Board of Revenue, Sindh, Malir Development Authority, the district administration and police to acquire land to complete Bahria Town Karachi, a privately owned gated suburb. In 2019 she returned to the story to expose the way in which the real estate developer had continued to extend its reach. She has also investigated the 'land mafia' in Karachi.

Work

Articles
 (with Fahim Zaman) 
 (with Fahim Zaman)

Documentary films
 The miseducation of Pakistan, 2007
 Among the believers, 2016

References

External links
 Interview with Naziha Syed Ali about undercover investigations
 

Year of birth missing (living people)
Living people
Pakistani investigative journalists
Pakistani women journalists
Dawn (newspaper) people